Fuscidea multispora is a species of foliicolous (leaf-dwelling), crustose lichen in the family Fuscideaceae. Found in Bolivia, it is known to occur only in a single high-altitude locality in a national park, where it grows on the leaves of coniferous trees from the genus Podocarpus.

Taxonomy
The lichen was formally described as a new species in 2019 by Adam Flakus, Kukwa, and Pamela Rodriguez-Flakus. It is only known to occur at the type locality, which is Andean forest dominated by Podocarpus and Polylepis trees.

Description
The prothallus is black. Apothecia are dark brown to black with a round outline, measuring 0.2–0.6 mm in diameter; they have a matte, dark brown to black disc that is flat to somewhat concave. The exiculum (the apothecial margin) is the same colour as the disc, and measures 40–80 μm wide. The ascospores typically have dimensions in the range 7–8.5 by 3.5–4.5 μm. Fuscidea multispora contains sekikaic acid, which is a lichen product that can be detected using thin-layer chromatography. The species epithet multispora makes reference to the multispored asci, which hold 16 ascospores.

References

Umbilicariales
Lichen species
Lichens described in 2019
Lichens of Bolivia
Taxa named by Adam Grzegorz Flakus